The Denver City Cable Railway Building on Lawrence Street in Denver, Colorado, opened in 1889.  Originally built to house power and maintenance facilities for Denver's cable car system, it now houses a restaurant and office space.  It was added to the National Register of Historic Places in 1979.  The current owner is Jim Judd.

History

1970s
The building was bought by Jim Judd and a partner in 1972 in the hopes of saving the building from being torn down in an urban renewal project.  In 1973, the Old Spaghetti Factory opened on the first floor.

2000s
In March 2007, the sale of the building from Mr. Judd to Central Development was announced.  Central Development plans a $35 million hotel and retail project that will include the current building.  Designed by the Buchanan Yonushewski Group the new hotel will have a glass facade and will wrap around the current building.

References

Colorado State Register of Historic Properties
National Register of Historic Places in Denver
Rail transportation in Colorado
Railway buildings and structures on the National Register of Historic Places
Railway buildings and structures on the National Register of Historic Places in Colorado
Cable car railways in the United States
Cableways on the National Register of Historic Places
Industrial buildings and structures on the National Register of Historic Places in Colorado
1889 establishments in Colorado